"Young Homie" is the debut single written and performed by American singer-songwriter Chris Rene. It is the first single from Rene's debut studio EP I'm Right Here. Following its release, the song debuted at number one on the New Zealand singles chart on March 19, 2012.

Background
Rene wrote the song prior to auditioning for the first season of the American version of singing talent competition The X Factor. Rene performed the song a total of three times on the show - at his first audition, during the top nine performance show and during the show's final.

Recording and release
Following The X Factor, Rene went on to record a studio version of the song that was released worldwide on March 13, 2012. A music video was also created in Rene's hometown of Santa Cruz, California on February 16, 2012 and released onto YouTube and Vevo on March 20, 2012.

Music video
The official music video for the song was directed by Jeremy Rall, and takes place in Santa Cruz, Rene's hometown. The video shows various parts and citizens of Santa Cruz, giving the viewers an idea of how the city inspired Rene to write the song.

Chart positions

References

External links
 

2012 debut singles
Chris Rene songs
Epic Records singles
Music videos directed by Jeremy Rall
Number-one singles in New Zealand
Song recordings produced by J. R. Rotem
Songs written by Marty James
Songs written by J. R. Rotem
2012 songs